Terry Flanagan MBE is an English former professional rugby league footballer who played in the 1970s and 1980s.

Playing career

International honours
Terry Flanagan won 4 caps for Great Britain while at Oldham in 1983 against France (2 matches), and in 1984 against New Zealand, and Papua New Guinea.

County Cup Final appearances
Terry Flanagan played  in Oldham's 6-27 defeat by Wigan in the 1986 Lancashire County Cup Final during the 1986–87 season at Knowsley Road, St. Helens on Sunday 19 October 1986.

Testimonial match
Flanagan's Testimonial match at Oldham took place in 1989.

Coaching
He coached Ireland from 1995-96.

Honoured at Oldham
Flanagan is an Oldham Hall of Fame inductee.

He was appointed Member of the Order of the British Empire (MBE) in the 2017 Birthday Honours for services to rugby league and to charity in the North West.

Genealogical information
Terry Flanagan is the son of the rugby league footballer who played in the 1940s and 1950s for Oldham, Broughton Rangers/Belle Vue Rangers and Castleford; William "Bill" Flanagan, the younger brother of rugby league footballer who played in the 1960s and 1970s for Oldham; Kevin Flanagan, and the father of the rugby league footballer; Mark Flanagan.

References

External links
!Great Britain Statistics at englandrl.co.uk (statistics currently missing due to not having appeared for both Great Britain, and England)
Profile at orl-heritagetrust.org.uk
Statistics at orl-heritagetrust.org.uk

Living people
English rugby league players
Great Britain national rugby league team players
Ireland national rugby league team coaches
Lancashire rugby league team players
Members of the Order of the British Empire
Oldham R.L.F.C. players
Place of birth missing (living people)
Rugby league hookers
Rugby league locks
Rugby league second-rows
Year of birth missing (living people)